Enrique "Kike" Boula Senobua (born 17 July 1993) is an Equatorial Guinean professional footballer who plays as a forward for Liga Nacional club Futuro Kings FC and the Equatorial Guinea national team.

Club career
Born in Malabo, Boula graduated from UD Almería's youth setup. He made his senior debuts with the reserves in the 2011–12 campaign, in Segunda División B.

In the 2013 summer Boula joined another reserve team, RCD Mallorca B in Tercera División. On 11 July 2015 he signed for Linares Deportivo, newly promoted to the third level. In summer 2016, he signed with Greek Football League club Kissamikos. On 23 June 2017, after being released, he signed for Xanthi.

International career
On 3 January 2015 Boula was included in Esteban Becker's Equatorial Guinea 23-men list for the 2015 Africa Cup of Nations. Four days later he made his full international debut, coming on as a second half substitute in a 1–1 friendly draw against Cape Verde.

Personal life
Boula's cousin Sena, was also a footballer. A midfielder, he too was groomed at Almería's youth system.

Statistics

International

References

External links
 
 
 Futbolme profile  
 
 

1993 births
Living people
Sportspeople from Malabo
Equatoguinean footballers
Association football forwards
Super League Greece players
Xanthi F.C. players
Football League (Greece) players
Cypriot First Division players
Cypriot Second Division players
Ermis Aradippou FC players
Futuro Kings FC players
Bubi people
Equatorial Guinea international footballers
2015 Africa Cup of Nations players
Equatoguinean expatriate footballers
Equatoguinean expatriate sportspeople in Greece
Expatriate footballers in Greece
Equatoguinean expatriate sportspeople in Cyprus
Expatriate footballers in Cyprus
Equatoguinean emigrants to Spain
Naturalised citizens of Spain
Footballers from Almería
Spanish footballers
Segunda División B players
Tercera División players
UD Almería B players
RCD Mallorca B players
Linares Deportivo footballers
Spanish people of Bubi descent
Spanish expatriate footballers
Spanish expatriate sportspeople in Greece
Spanish expatriate sportspeople in Cyprus